Kill Rock Stars is an album released in August 1991 by various artists on the Kill Rock Stars label. All of the bands on this record performed at the 1991 International Pop Underground Convention or are from Olympia.  The album was re-issued on vinyl in limited quantities as a Record Store Day exclusive in 2011.

Track listing (LP)

Track listing (CD)

References

1991 compilation albums
Kill Rock Stars compilation albums
Punk rock compilation albums
Record label compilation albums
Riot grrrl albums